Kerem Cem Dürük  , known professionally as Keremcem, is a Turkish pop singer and actor. He is best known for popular series Aşk Oyunu and O Hayat Benim. He also hosted the short-lived television show Keremcem ile Söyle Söyleyebilirsen on Star TV.

Biography 
Keremcem was born on 28 December 1977 in Milas. He attended Milas Sakarya Primary School, before enrolling in İzmir Private Fatih College (junior high). He graduated from high school in Turgutreis in 1995. He graduated from Ege University (University of Aegean) majoring in International Relations in 2003. He started playing guitar in high school.

His first composition "Elimde Değil", meaning "not in my hands", was made in 1996 in Ankara. He came to Istanbul in 2001. During this period, his friend Yunus Adak composed "Eylül". Yonca Evcimik introduced him to Aykut Gürel and so began his professional musical career as a singer. Two solo albums; Eylül (2004), Aşk Bitti (2006) and a duet album Maia (2005, feat. Seden Gürel) were produced by Iremrecords. He performed over 130 concerts all over Turkey, Cyprus, and Germany. He also performed the starring role in two TV series; Aşk Oyunu (2005–2006), İki Yabancı (2007) and Elif (2008) played as lead role in the series.

Discography

Filmography

Awards 
List of awards Keremcem has won during his career
2005, POPSAV Başarı Ödülleri
En İyi Çıkış Yapan Şarkıcı (Best Breakthrough Artist)
2005, 33. Altın Kelebek Ödülleri
En İyi Çıkış Yapan Erkek Soloist (Best Breakthrough Male Soloist)
2005, Future Gençlik ve Müzik Dergisi
En İyi Çıkış Yapan Erkek Sanatçı (Best Breakthrough Male Artist)
2006, 13. Kral TV Video Müzik Ödülleri
En İyi Pop Erkek Sarkıcı (Best Pop Male Artist)
2006, Google Türkiye
Yılın En Çok Ziyaret Edilen Web Sitesi "keremcem.com"  (Most Visited Web Site of the Year "keremcem.com"
2006, 10. İFA Ödülleri
En İyi Pop Erkek Şarkıcı (Best Pop Male Artist)
2006, NetBul Magazin
Türkiye'nin erkek pop star’ı (Turkey's male pop Star)
2007, Jetix
En Sevilen Türk Erkek Şarkıcı (The most popular Turkish male Singer)
2007, Walt Disney
HSM-2 Şarkılarını Kendi Diline En İyi Adapte Eden Şarkıcı (Best Adapted to he's songs in he's language Singer)
2008, Yılın En Has Bilişimcileri -Kadir Has Üni-
En İyi Resmi Web Sitesi www.keremcem.com.tr (Best Official Web Site www.keremcem.com.tr)
2009, Algida Max
En Sevilen Erkek Sanatçı (The most popular male Artists)
2009, Gerçek Pop
En İyi Orkestralı Video Klip "Sana Ferrari Gerekti" (Best Video Clip orchestral "Sana Ferrari Gerekti")
2010, Ayaklı Gazete
Türkiye'nin En Güzel Yüzlü Erkek Dizi Oyuncusu (Turkey's Most Beautiful Faces Female Player of the Series)
2010, Magazin Plus
Yılın En İyi Erkek Pop Sanatçısı (Best Pop Male Artist)
2010, Altın Kariyer Ödülleri -Muğla Üni.-
En İyi Türk Pop Sanatçısı (Best Turkish Pop Artist)

References

External links
 Official website
 
 Keremcem at Kinoturkey.ru

1977 births
Turkish pop singers
Turkish male television actors
Living people
21st-century Turkish male actors
21st-century Turkish singers